Model High School may refer to:

Model High School, in Georgia in the United States
Kanchannagar Model High School, Jhenaidah in Bangladesh
Robin Model High School, in Punjab state, India
Nanyang Model High School in Nanyang, China
Madison-Model High School in Richmond, Kentucky in the United States, a partnership between two separate high schools in that city that ended in the early 1960s
The high school component of Model Laboratory School, one of the two schools that formed Madison–Model
Chittagong Municipal Model High School in Bangladesh
Hira Model High School Mandani in Khyber Pakhtunkhwa, Pakistan
Motijheel Model High School and College, in Dhaka, Bangladesh